Melbourne Street may refer to:
Melbourne Street, North Adelaide, Australia
Melbourne Street, Perth, Australia